Shwekyimyin Pagoda is a notable pagoda in Mandalay, Burma, located on 24th Street, between 82nd and 83rd Streets. It was built in 1167 by Min Shin Saw, a prince from Pagan, who had come to the shores of the Aungbinle lake to cultivate rice. In the early 1900s, in one of its chapels, 40 images of Buddha found in the Mandalay Palace at the time of the British occupation in 1885 are kept for safe custody. A pagoda was built in 1852 over the older one. It is known for the Shweilnbin, an image of Gautama Buddha that was originally placed in the a pagoda built in Pagan by King Narapatisithu and consequently moved to other royal capitals.

Notes

References

Pagodas in Myanmar
Buddhist temples in Mandalay
Religious buildings and structures completed in 1167